The Port of Motomachi (元町港) is located Motomachi, Oshima, Tokyo, Tokyo.

Outline
The port of Motomachi has facilities which are waiting room and pier for mooring small boat. The waiting room also plays an important role in seeking refuge from volcanic bomb when Mt. Mihara erupts. When it is not possible for ferries to moor on Motomachi Port due to abysmal weather, ferries go to Okata Port which is an adjunct port of Motomachi in Oshima.

Facilities
There are ticket counter on the ground floor, a store which is named as minato にぎわいマーケット on the second floor, a restaurant which is named as minato にぎわいテーブル on the third floor, place of refuge on the forth floor.

Lanes 
The lanes are departure routes from this ferry terminal. But, when it is not possible for ferries to moor on Motomachi Port due to abysmal weather and so on, ferries go to Okata Port in Oshima, so when passengers confirm the timetable and port, should access a website of Tokai Kisen.

Ground transportation 
There is a bus stop located in front of the Motomachi Port, connecting it to around Oshima Island.

Surrounding area 
Volcano Museum
It takes about 7 minutes to travel from the port to the museum on foot.
Kodono Shrine
It takes about 10 minutes to travel from the port to the shrine on foot. It is dedicated to Minamoto no Tametomo.

Port of Okata

Okata Port is an adjunct port of Motomachi Port for mooring on this port instead of Motomachi when it is impossible for ferries to moor on the port of Motomachi.

Outline
Waiting room is facility for taking refuge from Tsunami and ferry terminal. There are waiting room and ticket counter on the ground floor, a store and rest space on the second floor, a restaurant on the third floor. And, a rooftop that height is 12.9m evacuation center from Tsunami.

Ground transportation 
There is a bus stop located in front of the Okata Port, connecting it to around Oshima Island.

References

External links 
 About lane of Tokai Kisen to/from Port of Motomachi
 About lane of Tokai Kisen to/from Port of Okata
About port of Motomachi
 About port of Okata

Motomachi
Water transport in Japan